The Rottweil Witch Trials were a series of witch trials in the town of Rottweil in Swabia, a town in what is now Germany,  between 1546 and 1661. 234 women and 53 men were accused of witchcraft. Out of 287 accused, only 21 were found innocent, while the other 266 were killed. The majority of the victims were burned to death, although some were beheaded (which was becoming more 'fashionable' in the 16th century). 400 years later, the town pardoned the accused posthumously. A commemorative plaque was placed on the tower in the city, which was formerly a prison, to serve as a memorial for the victims of the trials.

Known victims

1546 - Ottilia Pöttin burned to death

1546 - Agatha Seyfried burned to death

1546 - Walburga Posenberger burned to death

1546 - Walburga Zimmermann aus Rottenburg (Also known as Rottenburg am Neckar) burned to death

1547 - Anna Hermanns burned to death

1554 - Margaretha Weißbrot von Schemberg burned to death

1561 - Catharina Höhnmeyer burned to death

1561 - Margaretha Parnayer burned to death

1561 - Barbara Rebin von der Neuenburg burned to death 

1566 - Elsa Rainherin aus Straßberg burned to death

1566 - Wilhelm Zorn aus Schwäbisch Gmünd beaten and burned to death

1569 - Margaretha Höhn burned to death

1569 - Anna Quatlender von Weiler burned to death

1571 - Catharina Strobenhauser aus Horb burned

1572 - Ursula aus der Wentin burned to death

1572 Margaretha Reiderken burned to death

1572 Barbara Vogler burned to death

1572 Hans Kilian aus Pfullingen burned to death 

1572 Margaretha Stimler aus Waldmössingen burned to death

1572 Petronellea Rein aus Trailfingen  burned to death

1573 Anna Kermann Witwe von Hans Bilgen burned to death

1573 Waldpurga Dilgass genannt Faulhaberin burned to death

1574 Margaretha Burg aus Binzwangen burned to death

1574 Hans Baugen aus der Altstadt burned to death

1574 Barbara Heinzmann burned to death

1574 Margaretha Hochburger aus Ravensburg burned to death

1574 Apollonia Winding von Sunderfingen burned to death

1574 Barbara Egloff killed by unknown means

1575 Margaretha Brig von Hangen burned to death

1576 Ursula Rößler burned to death

1577 Rosina Gräf burned to death

1579 Barbara Nieth von Blattenhardt vor Hinrichtung branded and burned to death

1580 Barbara Strom von Trossingen burned to death

1580 Hans Engel gerädert dann burned to death

1580 Michel Reitz von Ratshausen burned to death

1581 Waldburga Heinzelmann von Schramberg burned to death

1582 Paul Benz von Westhofen burned to death

1582 Hans Dorn von Hasenweiler gerädert dann burned to death

1582 Hans Heinrich Hessen von Lützelburg beaten then burned to death

1583 Anna Möslin burned to death

1583 Cordula Müller burned to death

1583 Margaretha Rötlin burned to death

1584 Ulrich Loschner von Metzingen burned to death

1584 Michael Frieß ein Schmied burned to death

1584 Hans Jacobs von Molspern burned to death

1585 Apollonia Klug aus dem Blatterhaus burned to death

1585 Margaretha Breller burned to death

1586 Anna Werlin burned to death

1586 Apollonia Marstall burned to death

1586 deren Mann Hans Schürlin burned to death

1586 Hans Reinhardt von Geißlingen bei Ulm burned to death

1586 Matthias Kugel von Brienbach burned to death

1587 Angesa Decker von Meßstetten burned to death

1587 Anna Funck aus Erla unter Rosenfeld burned to death

1587 Agnes Rosenberger burned to death

1588 Anna Menin aus der Altstadt burned to death

1588 Katharina Ruopp von Tailfingen burned to death

1588 Margaretha Baurmännin von Schwenninge burned to death

1588 Anna Scherlin burned to death

1588 Agneta Petermann drowned

1588 Daughter of Agneta Petermann drowned

1588 Katharina Gender burned to death

1589 Anna Kurt von Zeidlfingen burned to death

1590 Salomea Herder burned to death

1590 Conrad Haller burned to death

1590 Barbara Zeller burned to death

1590 Paula Biler von Pforra bei Eschingen burned to death

1590 Thongius Schentzlin von Schwenningen burned to death

1591 Hans Bosch von Wernsreute bei Ravensburg burned to death

1591 Anna Vischer burned to death

1591 Catharina Ackerknecht burned to death

1592 Anna Schuler Witwe Folter dann Haft

1592 Conrad Ernst von Reutlingen burned to death

1592 Anna Probst burned to death

1592 Brigitta Pöttlin burned to death

1592 Martin Brienen burned to death

1592 Verena Hundspissin von Tuttlingen burned to death

1592 Ursula Häsin von Täbingen burned to death

1592 Anna Stieling aus der Altstadt burned to death

1593 Tobias Wirt aus Steißlingen beaten then burned to death

1593 Martin Fritz aus Kemnat beaten then burned to death

1593 Hans Schlieffer von Frittlingen beaten then burned to death

1593 Heinrich Fausten aus dem Breisgau beaten then burned to death

1593 Georg Finckhels aus dem Gunthartz beaten then burned to death

1593 Hans Schmidt burned to death

1593 Margaretha Waldkaff von Sigmaringen dem Dorf burned to death

1595 Georg Jank von Mörspurg beaten then burned to death

1595 Hans Wilden von Tüwingen beaten then burned to death

1595 Anna Burdig von Tuningen burned to death

1595 Barbara Pack von Bretingen burned to death

1595 Margaretha Piekherna von Schleickhen burned to death

1595 Jacob Striegel der Alte burned to death

1595 Anna Wernitz burned to death

References

Rottweil (district)
Trials in Germany